Friendswood High School is a public secondary school located in Friendswood, Texas, United States. The school serves grades 9 through 12, and is a part of the Friendswood Independent School District (ISD).

It borders the Alvin, Pearland and Clear Creek school districts.

Most of the city of Friendswood is within Friendswood ISD and is zoned to Friendswood High School. All students in Friendswood ISD public schools attend Friendswood High School.

Since 2007, the school's principal has been Mark Griffon.

History
Previously all grades K-12 of Friendswood ISD were in a single building. In 2006 Todd Spivak of the Houston Press noted that multiple generations of the same families attended Friendswood High, and that the school had a "long-held reputation for academic excellence."

Connected schools
All Friendswood ISD schools feed into Friendswood High School. This includes Cline and Westwood Elementaries, Zue S. Bales and Windsong Intermediate School, and Friendswood Junior High.

Extracurricular activities
FHS extracurricular activities include drama and musical productions, choir, band, service organizations, and clubs. They compete in academic contests including Academic Decathlon and Octathlon, speech, debate, and competitive sports governed by the University Interscholastic League (UIL). Competing in UIL in the 2008-2009 and 2009-2010 school years won Friendswood High School the 4A Lone Star Cup both years which is a culmination of UIL Academics and UIL Sports.

Accolades
Friendswood ISD has been named the fifth most efficient Texas School District by the Texas Business Coalition. Friendswood High School was named 1 of 13 Top High Schools in the State as well as 1 of 10 Top High Schools in the Houston area. The Band, Choir, Drama, and Drill Team Departments have been awarded exceptional honors annually. The Mighty Mustang Band received second at the UIL 4A State Marching Band Contest in 2003, 2005, and 2009.  The band finished fourth in 2007 and 2011, as well as fifth in 2013 and sixth in 2019.

Notable alumni 
 Larry Taylor, Republican member of the Texas Senate from District 11 (2013–Present) and Texas House of Representatives from District 24 (2003-2013)
 Scott Williamson, Class of 1994, former MLB pitcher for the Cincinnati Reds
 Karan Jerath, named to Forbes 30 Under 30 at the age of 19 for his innovative oil and gas wellhead containment device

References 

 https://web.archive.org/web/20090903171537/http://www.ci.friendswood.tx.us/COF/about/school/default.htm

External links
 Friendswood High School
 http://www.friendswoodmustangband.org/
 Friendswood ISD
 http://www.fhsmustangbaseball.org/mustangs-in-the-pros.html

High schools in Galveston County, Texas
Public high schools in Texas